Wheelchair tennis at the 2020 Summer Paralympics in Tokyo, Japan took place at the Ariake Tennis Park from 27 August to 4 September 2021.

The 2020 Summer Olympic and Paralympic Games were postponed to 2021 due to the COVID-19 pandemic. They kept the 2020 name and were held from 24 August to 5 September 2021.

Patrick Selepe became the first disabled umpire to officiate in a wheelchair Paralympic event.

Qualification
 There are 56 male (singles and doubles), 32 female (singles and doubles) and 16 quad (singles and doubles). 
 The qualification slots are awarded to the individual athletes, not to the NPCs and they should not exceed the maximum total quota allocation of 11 qualification slots.
 A maximum of eight qualification slots (4 male, 4 female) can be allocated to men's and women's singles events respectively. 
 A maximum of three in the quads' class.
 A maximum of two men's or women's teams to represent the doubles' events.
 One team, of mixed gender, is eligible to compete in the quads doubles.
 An athlete has to have an official ranking on the Wheelchair Tennis Singles World Ranking List dated 7 June 2021.
 An athlete would be eligible to qualify if they have been in a final nominated team and was present in the World Team Cup events including qualifying and Junior World Team Cup for a minimum of two years between 2017 and 2020.
 An athlete would have to fulfill the minimum requirements in the ITF's Tokyo 2020 Wheelchair Tennis Regulations which will be published in late 2021.
 The ITF and the IPC have to consider on bipartite commission invitation athletes who don't have an official ranking but as long as they have competed in one ITF Wheelchair Tennis competition between 1 January 2018 to 6 June 2021, they will be eligible to compete.

Schedule

Medal table

Medalists

See also
Tennis at the 2020 Summer Olympics

References

External links
Results book 

2020 Summer Paralympics events
2020
Paralympics
Tennis tournaments in Japan
2021 in Japanese tennis
Wheelchair tennis at the 2020 Summer Paralympics